Gabriel Gandarillas (born August 18, 1975 in Don Bosco (Buenos Aires), Argentina) is an Argentine footballer currently playing for Deportes Concepción of the Primera División B in Chile.

Teams
  Argentino de Quilmes 1996-2000
  San Telmo 2000-2003
  Tristán Suárez 2003-2005
  San Telmo 2005-2008
  Almirante Brown 2008-2010
  Los Andes 2011
  Deportes Concepción 2012–present

Titles
  Almirante Brown 2007-2008 (Primera B Metropolitana Championship)

External links
 
 

1975 births
Living people
Argentine footballers
Argentine expatriate footballers
Club Atlético Los Andes footballers
San Telmo footballers
CSyD Tristán Suárez footballers
Club Almirante Brown footballers
Deportes Concepción (Chile) footballers
Primera B de Chile players
Expatriate footballers in Chile
Association footballers not categorized by position
Sportspeople from Buenos Aires Province